Ihar Astapkovich (also Igor Vyacheslavovich Astapkovich, ; born 4 January 1963, in Navapolatsk) is a hammer thrower who won two Olympic medals, first representing the Soviet Union and later his home country of Belarus.

He won silver medals at three consecutive World Championships, and became the 1990 European champion. His personal best throw of 84.62 metres, achieved in 1992, puts him 6th on the all-time performer's list.

Astapkovich is married to discus thrower Irina Yatchenko.

International competitions

References

External links
 
 
 

1963 births
Living people
People from Navapolatsk
Athletes from Minsk
Belarusian male hammer throwers
Soviet male hammer throwers
Olympic athletes of the Unified Team
Olympic athletes of Belarus
Olympic silver medalists for the Unified Team
Olympic bronze medalists for Belarus
Athletes (track and field) at the 1992 Summer Olympics
Athletes (track and field) at the 1996 Summer Olympics
Athletes (track and field) at the 2000 Summer Olympics
Athletes (track and field) at the 2004 Summer Olympics
World Athletics Championships athletes for Belarus
World Athletics Championships athletes for the Soviet Union
World Athletics Championships medalists
European Athletics Championships medalists
World record holders in masters athletics
Medalists at the 2000 Summer Olympics
Medalists at the 1992 Summer Olympics
Olympic silver medalists in athletics (track and field)
Olympic bronze medalists in athletics (track and field)
Universiade medalists in athletics (track and field)
Goodwill Games medalists in athletics
Universiade gold medalists for the Soviet Union
CIS Athletics Championships winners
Soviet Athletics Championships winners
Medalists at the 1987 Summer Universiade
Medalists at the 1989 Summer Universiade
Competitors at the 1990 Goodwill Games